180° Rule is a 2020 Iranian drama film directed and written by Farnoosh Samadi, starring Sahar Dolatshahi, Pejman Jamshidi, Azita Hajian and Hasan Pourshirazi. The film premiered at the 2020 Toronto International Film Festival. 

The film received two nominations at the 39th Fajr Film Festival.

Cast

 Sahar Dolatshahi as Sara
 Pejman Jamshidi as Hamed
 Azita Hajian as Sara's mother
 Hasan Pourshirazi
 Bahman Taghizadeh
 Sadaf Asgari
 Amirreza Ranjbaran as Sara's brother
 Mohammad Heidari
 Navid Bani
 Katayoun Salki
 Nava Nemati

Reception

Critical response
On review aggregator website Rotten Tomatoes, 64% of 14 reviews are positive for the film, with an average rating of 6.1/10.

Accolades

References

External links

Iranian drama films
2020 films
Films directed by Farnoosh Samadi
2020s Persian-language films
2020 drama films